Alfons Stawski (born 1 January 1945) is a Polish boxer. He competed in the men's welterweight event at the 1972 Summer Olympics. At the 1972 Summer Olympics, he lost to Richard Murunga of Kenya.

References

1945 births
Living people
Polish male boxers
Olympic boxers of Poland
Boxers at the 1972 Summer Olympics
People from Brodnica County
Sportspeople from Kuyavian-Pomeranian Voivodeship
Welterweight boxers